The Isles of Mosana are the two small islets of Vaitupu, Tuvalu.

References

Islands of Tuvalu
Vaitupu